Ichiban Records is an American independent record label, founded in 1985 by John Abbey and Nina Easton in Atlanta, Georgia, United States.

History
Wrap Records and Nastymix Records were some of its subsidiary labels. Urgent! Records and Mr. Henry Records of Houston were both distributed by Ichiban.  Besides recording a string of hip hop groups in later years, Ichiban originally specialised in blues and has also released albums by musicians such as Buster Benton and Raful Neal. Ichiban filed for Chapter 11 bankruptcy in 1999. The catalog is now controlled by EMI, but nothing has been reissued since the label ceased operations.

The label's name "ichi-ban", is Japanese for "number one" or "first one", an expression commonly used in Japan to mean, the best.

Notable artists

Hip hop
A.W.O.L.
Detroit's Most Wanted
DFC
Gangsta Pat
Ghetto Mafia
Hard Boyz
Insane Poetry
Kid Sensation
Kilo Ali
Kool Moe Dee
MC Brains
MC Breed 
Rodney O & Joe Cooley
Sir Mix-a-Lot 
Success-n-Effect
Vanilla Ice
Willie D

Soul
Clarence Carter
Willie Clayton
Millie Jackson
Barbara Lynn
The Three Degrees
Tyrone Davis
Little Johnny Taylor
Scola

Funk
Slave

Blues/jazz/rock
Roy Ayers
Buster Benton 
Ben E. King
Gary B.B. Coleman
Dash Rip Rock
Deadeye Dick
The Fleshtones
Little Mike and the Tornadoes
Lil John
Luther "Houserocker" Johnson
Joey Gilmore
Big Joe & the Dynaflows
Ernie Lancaster
Trudy Lynn
Jerry McCain
Floyd Miles
Raful Neal
Phunk Junkeez
Tom Principato
Artie "Blues Boy" White
Blues Boy Willie
Chick Willis

See also
Stax Records
Goldwax Records

References

External links
Discogs entry
Albums

 
 
Hip hop record labels
American record labels